Coryogalops is a genus of gobies native to the southeastern Atlantic Ocean and the western Indian Ocean along the coasts of Africa and Asia from South Africa to Pakistan.

Species
There are currently 12 recognized species in this genus:
 Coryogalops adamsoni (Goren, 1985) (Adamson's goby)
 Coryogalops anomolus J. L. B. Smith, 1958 (Anomalous goby)
 Coryogalops bretti Goren, 1991
 Coryogalops bulejiensis (Hoda, 1983) (Thin-barred goby)
 Coryogalops guttatus Kovačić & Bogorodsky, 2014 
 Coryogalops monospilus J. E. Randall, 1994 (One-spot goby)
 Coryogalops nanus Kovačić & Bogorodsky, 2016 
 Coryogalops ocheticus (Norman, 1927)
 Coryogalops pseudomonospilus Kovačić & Bogorodsky, 2014 
 Coryogalops sordidus (J. L. B. Smith, 1959) (Epaulette goby)
 Coryogalops tessellatus J. E. Randall, 1994
 Coryogalops william (J. L. B. Smith, 1948) (Kaalpens goby)

References

Gobiidae